South Phoenix Airlines is an airline operating in the Philippines. The airline was formerly known as South Phoenix Airways. The company mainly provides charter flights to different destinations and also operates non-scheduled services. Plans to start flights with a BAe Jetstream 41 are also ongoing.

The company also started a subsidiary named Air Republiq to cater the islands of Batanes, linking them to different major cities of Luzon. It uses the Piper Navajo for this purpose.

Plans to start direct flights to Manila from Basco are also underway.

Destinations
Manila
El Nido
Busuanga
Puerto Princesa
Basco
Itbayat
Tuguegarao
Laoag

Fleet
1 Beechcraft Queen Air (retired)
1 Beechcraft King Air B200
1 Cessna 172 (retired)
1 Cessna Citation
1 Cessna 421
1 BAe Jetstream 41
1 NAMC YS-11 24-seater commuter-configured
3 NAMC YS-11 60-seater commuter-configured
2 Piper PA-31-30 Navajo Chieftain (painted in Air Republiq livery)

References

External links
Official website

Airlines of the Philippines
Airlines established in 1987
Companies based in Manila
Philippine companies established in 1987